The Netherlands competed at the 1960 Summer Olympics in Rome, Italy. 110 competitors, 80 men and 30 women, took part in 54 events in 13 sports.

Medalists

Silver
 Marianne Heemskerk – Swimming, Women's 100m Butterfly

Bronze
 Wieger Mensonides – Swimming, Men's 200m Breaststroke
 Tineke Lagerberg – Swimming, Women's 400m Freestyle

Athletics

Boxing

Canoeing

Cycling

Thirteen male cyclists represented the Netherlands in 1960.

Individual road race
 Jan Hugens
 Jan Janssen
 René Lotz
 Lex van Kreuningen

Team time trial
 Jan Hugens
 René Lotz
 Ab Sluis
 Lex van Kreuningen

Sprint
 Piet van der Touw
 Aad de Graaf

1000m time trial
 Piet van der Touw

Tandem
 Rinus Paul
 Mees Gerritsen

Team pursuit
 Jaap Oudkerk
 Theo Nikkessen
 Henk Nijdam
 Piet van der Lans

Diving

Fencing

Five fencers, one man and four women, represented the Netherlands in 1960.

Men's épée
 Max Dwinger

Women's foil
 Elly Botbijl
 Nina Kleijweg
 Daniëlle van Rossem

Women's team foil
 Nina Kleijweg, Daniëlle van Rossem, Leni Kokkes-Hanepen, Elly Botbijl

Gymnastics

Hockey

Rowing

The Netherlands had 13 male rowers participate in five out of seven rowing events in 1960.

 Men's single sculls
 Lex Redelé

 Men's double sculls – 5th place
 Peter Bakker
 Co Rentmeester

 Men's coxless pair
 Steven Blaisse
 Ernst Veenemans

 Men's coxed pair
 Maarten van Dis
 Arnold Wientjes
 Jan Just Bos

 Men's coxed four
 Toon de Ruiter
 Frank Moerman
 Ype Stelma
 Henk Wamsteker
 Marius Klumperbeek

Sailing

Finn
 Hans Sleeswijk 24th, 2265 points

Flying Dutchman
 Ben Verhagen & Gerardus Lautenschutz 5th, 5452 points

Swimming

Water polo

Men's Team Competition
Preliminary Round (Group C)
 Lost to Yugoslavia (1–2)
 Defeated Australia (5–3)
 Tied with South Africa (3–3)
Semi Final Round (Group 2)
 Lost to Hungary (1–3)
 Lost to United States (6–7)
Classification Round (5th/8th)
 Lost to Romania (4–5)
 Lost to Germany (5–6) → 8th place
Team Roster
Fred van Dorp
Henk Hermsen
Ben Kniest
Harry Lamme
Bram Leenards
Hans Muller
Harro Ran
Harry Vriend
Fred van der Zwan

Wrestling

References

External links
Official Olympic Reports
International Olympic Committee results database

Nations at the 1960 Summer Olympics
1960
Olympics